E. Keith Rasmussen is a former American football coach and college athletics administrator. He served as the head football coach at Bethany College in Lindsborg, Kansas from 1965 to 1973, compiling a record of 42–39–3. Rasmussen was also the athletic director at Bethany from 1966 to 1974.

Head coaching record

College football

References

1930s births
Living people
American football centers
Bethany Swedes athletic directors
Bethany Swedes football coaches
Bethany Swedes football players
College track and field coaches in the United States
High school basketball coaches in Kansas
High school football coaches in Kansas